, also known as KHB, is a Japanese broadcast network affiliated with the ANN. Their headquarters are located in Miyagi Prefecture.

History
October 1, 1975: It was set up as Miyagi Prefecture's fourth broadcasting station.
June 18, 2006: Their Sendai main station started their Digital terrestrial television service.
March 11, 2011: During the 2011 Tohoku earthquake and tsunami, KHB news personnel reported NHK's unfavorable attitude in news reporting.
March 31, 2012: All-analog TV stations were abolished.
September 20, 2021: KHB moved to its newly built headquarters in Asuto-Nagamachi, Taihaku-ku, Sendai City from its former headquarters in Futabagaoka, Aoba-ku, Sendai City.
September 30, 2021: After moving to its new headquarters 10 days earlier, a new company logo officially replaced the former logo that was in use since it was founded.

Stations

Analog Stations
Sendai(Main Station) JOEM-TV 32ch

Digital Stations(ID:5)
Sendai(Main Station) JOEM-DTV 28ch

Programs

Rival Stations

References

External links
 KHB Official Site

All-Nippon News Network
Asahi Shimbun Company
Television stations in Japan
Television channels and stations established in 1975
Mass media in Sendai
Companies based in Sendai